Danger Biscuit is a 1969 Indian Malayalam film, directed by A. B. Raj and produced by T. E. Vasudevan. The film stars Prem Nazir, Sheela, Adoor Bhasi, N. Govindankutty, Sadhana, Paravoor Bharathan and Kottayam Chellappan in the lead roles. The film had musical score by V. Dakshinamoorthy.

Balachandran, an undercover policeman, is tasked with investigating the smuggling of gold biscuits, which leads him to shocking discoveries.

Cast

Prem Nazir
N. Govindankutty
Sadhana
Paravoor Bharathan
Kottayam Chellappan
K. P. Ummer as Dr. Sudhakaran
G. K. Pillai
C. A. Balan
Abbas
Sankaradi
Adoor Bhasi
Sukumari as Muthu Lakshmi
Sheela as Dr. Aswathi

Soundtrack
The music was composed by V. Dakshinamoorthy and the lyrics were written by Sreekumaran Thampi.

References

External links
 

1969 films
1960s Malayalam-language films